Iris missouriensis (syn. I. montana) is a hardy flowering rhizomatous species of the genus Iris, in the family Iridaceae.  Its common names include western blue flag, Rocky Mountain iris, and Missouri flag.

It is native to western North America. Its distribution is varied; it grows at high elevations in mountains and alpine meadows and all the way down to sea level in coastal hills.

Description

The inflorescence usually consists of one or two flowers, exceptionally three or four. Each flower has three light to dark blue, spreading or reflexed sepals lined with purple and three smaller upright blue petals. They produce a large fruit capsule.

The plant populations often spread outwards from the older plants, leaving a dead opening in the center of a growing ring.

Uses
Some Native American tribes made cordage from the plant's stems and leaves. Some Plateau Indian tribes used the roots to treat toothache.
The Navajo used a decoction of the plant as an emetic. Plains Indians are said to have extracted the toxin irisin from the plant to use as arrow poison. The Zuni apply a poultice of chewed root to increase the strength of newborns and infants.

This iris is listed as a weed in some areas, particularly in agricultural California. It is bitter and distasteful to livestock and heavy growths of the plant are a nuisance in pasture land. Heavy grazing in an area promotes the growth of this hardy iris.

The plant is widely cultivated in temperate regions.

Toxicity
The plant is toxic, particularly the rootstalks, which contain the potentially lethal irisin.

References

External links

UC Photos gallery   — Iris missouriensis

missouriensis
Flora of the Northwestern United States
Flora of the Southwestern United States
Flora of Western Canada
Flora of Mexico
Plants used in traditional Native American medicine
Garden plants of North America
Flora without expected TNC conservation status